Ilse Thiele (4 November 1920 – 10 January 2010) was an East German politician.   She was a member of the powerful Central Committee of the country's ruling SED (party) between 1954 and 1989.   She served as the Chair of the national Democratic Women's League from 1953 till 1989.

Life

Early years
Ilse Neukrantz was born in Berlin's central Lichtenberg quarter.   Her father was a warehouseman  who was later employed in clerical work. Her mother was a milliner. Ilse and her brother  attended junior and middle school locally.   From 1937 till 1945, she worked as a stenographer by court.

Politicised housewife
The war ended in May 1945 and with it came the end of Nazi Germany and of one-party government. Ilse Thiele, now a housewife in Wietze (near Celle), joined the Communist Party.  By the next year, she had relocated to the Soviet occupation zone in what remained of Germany.  Here, in April 1946, the contentious merger of the old Communist Party with the Moderate-left SPD paved the way for a return to one-party government, and Thiele was one of the thousands of Communist Party members who quickly took the opportunity to sign their membership over to the new Socialist Unity Party of Germany (SED / ).

Still working as a stenographer with various employers, in 1946, she joined the Trade Unions Federation (FDGP / ).   Between 1948 and 1950 she served as a local councilor with responsibility for social affairs in Berlin-Lichtenberg.   Between 1946 and 1952, she was also a member of the party leadership team in Lichtenberg. In 1950, she became the Berlin regional secretary for the Democratic Women's League (DFD). In 1950/51, she also studied at the Karl Marx Party Academy.

Political establishment
In 1953, Ilse Thiele succeeded Elli Schmidt as national president of the Democratic Women's League, one of several quasi-political mass movements that were a feature of East Germany's Soviet based constitutional structure. Thiele would continue to head up the DFD till November 1989. The role was an important one:  Thiele's long tenure contrasted with her predecessor's fall from grace, and may have reflected her own ferocious loyalty to the national leadership, especially during the politically nervous early 1950s.

At the heart of power
In April 1954, Thiele became one of the 91 members of the Party Central Committee. The constitutional structure of the German Democratic Republic insisted on the leading role of the party, and central committee membership placed her at the heart of decision making in a system which required government ministers merely to carry out the policy decisions of the party. Thiele remained a Central Committee member for two and a half decades, until the Central Committee itself resigned in November 1989 as part of the run-up to reunification.

From 1954 through till March 1990, Ilse Thiele also sat as a member of the National legislature. Despite her membership of the ruling SED (party), in the assembly, she represented not the SED but the DFD.

In 1954, she became a member of the Presidium of the National Front, the organisational alliance  of second tier political parties and mass movements used by the SED to manage and, where necessary, control these elements. In 1971, she joined the national Council of State, remaining a member till January 1990.

Internationally, from 1964 till 1989, she was a vice-president of the Women's International Democratic Federation, which, during the Cold war years, was widely seen as a left-leaning pro-Soviet confederation.

Death
Ilse Thiele died in Berlin early in 2010, a couple of months after her 89th birthday.

Awards and honours
1957: Clara Zetkin Medal
1965: Patriotic Order of Merit in Gold
1985: Order of Karl Marx

References

1920 births
2010 deaths
Politicians from Berlin
Members of the Central Committee of the Socialist Unity Party of Germany
Members of the State Council of East Germany
Members of the 1st Volkskammer
Members of the 2nd Volkskammer
Members of the 3rd Volkskammer
Members of the 4th Volkskammer
Members of the 5th Volkskammer
Members of the 6th Volkskammer
Members of the 7th Volkskammer
Members of the 8th Volkskammer
Members of the 9th Volkskammer
Democratic Women's League of Germany members
Female members of the Volkskammer
20th-century German women politicians
Recipients of the Patriotic Order of Merit in gold